This is a '''list of windmills in Bornholm, Denmark.

The list

References

External links
 Windmills on Bornholm (in Danish)
 Windmills on Bornholm (in Danish)

Windmills in Denmark
Windmills
Tourist attractions in the Capital Region of Denmark
Windmills on Bornholm